Physcaeneura jacksoni is a butterfly in the family Nymphalidae. It is found in north-eastern Tanzania.

References

Endemic fauna of Tanzania
Satyrini
Butterflies described in 1961